Josef Vojtech (born 9 September 1925) was an Austrian weightlifter. He competed in the men's bantamweight event at the 1948 Summer Olympics.

References

External links

1925 births
Possibly living people
Austrian male weightlifters
Olympic weightlifters of Austria
Weightlifters at the 1948 Summer Olympics
Place of birth missing
20th-century Austrian people